Adam Biddle may refer to:

 Adam Biddle (cinematographer), English cinematographer
 Adam Biddle (soccer) (born 1988), Australian football (soccer) player